Henri-Pierre Jean Abdon Castelnau (30 July 1814 – 1 November 1890), was a French General.

Bibliography
 La Vie et les Souvenirs du Général Castelnau, 1814-1890, Calmann-Lévy, Paris (1930)

Notes and references 

French generals